The Vishwakarma Institute of Information Technology is an autonomous institute of engineering in Pune, India. Established in 2002, it is affiliated to the Savitribai Phule Pune University. The college is run by the Bansilal Ramanath Agarwal Charitable Trust. In 2017 the University Grant Commission granted it autonomous status.

It is consistently ranked as one of the top colleges in Pune, with the recognition and approval of the All India Council of Technical Education, New Delhi. DsP has been accredited by NAAC and has received an A grade with CGPA of 3.14. In 2016, DsP awarded as 'Outstanding Engineering Institute - West" by Vijayavani National Education Leadership Awards..

Courses 
The Vishwakarma Institute offers following courses.

Ph.D. Program
 Ph.D. in Electronics and Telecommunication Engineering
 Ph.D. in Civil Engineering

Undergraduate 
Bachelor of Technology (B.Tech) courses are for a duration of four years:
 Computer Engineering
 Electronics Engineering
 Electronics and Telecommunication Engineering
 Civil Engineering
 Information Technology
 Mechanical Engineering
 Artificial Intelligence & Data Science

College activities

Gandharva (Annual Techno-Cultural Fest)

Every year since 2002, the college has hosted Gandharva, an annual techno-cultural fest. It is considered as Pune's much awaited Techno-Cultural fest. Participated by students from various colleges in and outside the city. Gandharva includes various events like sports days, a Funfair, quizzes, workshops and technical competitions. In January 2012, the event was accompanied by the launch of a website, a logo and merchandise. It also includes cultural activities like singing, music, dancing. Each year, Gandharva is celebrated for three to five days.

National Service Scheme

The college has established a strong group under National Service Scheme for contributing towards the society. As part of this, the college has adopted a village Jamgaon Disli approximately 35 km from Pune, near Mulshi, for various social development activities. As a result of students' efforts, the village Jamgaon acquired the status of Nirmal Gram in January 2010.

Sci-Tech (tech fest)

Sci-tech is annual science exhibition in which students from FE(First year of Engineering) to BE(Final year of Engineering) participate with their projects, new ideas and engineering research.

Robocon

Robocon is Asia's largest robotics competition. A student-organized team is sponsored by the college.

Firodaya and Purushottam karandak

Team "Avishkar" is a cultural team of the college that participates in the prestigious acting and cultural competitions held in Pune. Student teams work on their acting and oratory skills. Over one lac is spent by the college on both the events separately. In the past few years, the Vishwakarma Institute has achieved great status in Firodiya and Purushottam karandak.
 II nd position in Firodiya Karandak 'Jayaprabha' in 2016.
 III rd position in Firodiya karandak 'Handle with care' in 2014.
 II nd position in Firodiya karandak 'Pazar' in 2013.
 I st First Position in Firodia Karandak 'Positive' in 2011.
 Finalist in Firodiya Karandak 'Time Please' in 2008.
 IV th position in Firodiya karandak 'Daav' in 2017.
 Best Organizing Team in Purushottam Karandak 'To Mazi Vaat Pahat Asel' 2010.
 Best Organizing Team in Purushottam Karandak 'Andhalyaa-Khidkyaa' in 2009.

Entrepreneurship Development Cell 

The Entrepreneurship Development Cell is a student body organization that develops entrepreneurial skills. It aims to bridge the gap between technical knowledge and management skills, and hosts an annual national entrepreneur's summit called "Vishwapreneur" that attracts entrepreneurs and government authorities to share their knowledge and experience. Also "CorpStrata" is the event of FE student which is hosted annually. National-level business competitions, industrial visits and guest lecturers conducted throughout the year for students and professionals. As of 2018 the cell is headed by President Snehit Kumar, supported by a dedicated team of third year engineering students under the mentorship of Professors Ravindra S. Acharya and Kirti Wanjale.The cell has also incubated multiple start-ups and promote students for the same.

Sister institutes 
The BRACT runs the following institutes:

Vishwakarma Institute Of Information Technology, Kondhwa BK, Pune, Maharashtra
Vishwakarma Institute Of Technology, Bibvewadi, Pune, Maharashtra
Sandipani Technical Campus(VIT), Kolpa,Nanded Road,Latur. Maharashtra

References

External links
 Official website
 

Information technology institutes
Colleges affiliated to Savitribai Phule Pune University
Engineering colleges in Pune
Educational institutions established in 2002
2002 establishments in Maharashtra